Karolina Dean, also known as Lucy in the Sky, L.S.D., or Princess Justice, is a fictional superhero appearing in American comic books published by Marvel Comics, first appearing in the series Runaways.

Karolina has been described as one of Marvel's most notable and powerful female heroes, being labeled as a prominent LGBT character.

Karolina Dean was portrayed by Virginia Gardner in the Hulu Marvel Cinematic Universe television series Runaways.

Publication history
Author Brian K. Vaughan, the creator of Runaways, played a significant role in the character's development throughout the series along with collaborator Adrian Alphonam. Alphonam contributed both artistic and written talents to the characters inception. The character debuted in Runaways #1.

Fictional character biography

The Pride
Karolina is the daughter of renowned Hollywood actors Frank and Leslie Dean and is the only older Runaway who didn't witness their parents murder an innocent girl as a sacrifice.  Karolina denies the entire situation primarily, but finally believes the group soon after discovering she is an alien. The kids decide to go for a massive ransack, and leave home; before leaving for good, they decide to put their parents to justice by collecting certain evidence from their homes. When arriving at the Dean mansion, they find Karolina's parent's last will and testament; Karolina is given a piece of paper with the circular "no symbol" covering the Caduceus. Alex convinces her to remove her medic alert bracelet because it is emblazoned with the symbol. Karolina angrily concedes, thinking that she only wears the bracelet because she's allergic to penicillin, and her skin immediately glows with a fluid, rainbow-like light. Remembering something they heard from the Pride's sacrifice, the group assumes Karolina is an alien and the bracelet is an anchor to hide her powers; Leslie Dean later confirms these theories for Karolina. After escaping their parents, Karolina takes the name Lucy in the Sky, a reference to the song "Lucy in the Sky with Diamonds".

Personality
Early in the series, Karolina constantly struggled with her alien heritage, feeling that she is a "freak" amongst the group, the only one who needs to actively hide her true form. Another insecurity was of her speculated homosexuality. Her insecurities even prompt Karolina to offer her life to the vampire Topher, as Karolina expresses little desire to live. After her first near-death experience at the hands of Alex Wilder, Karolina overcomes her death wish and helps the Runaways escape the rampaging Gibborim as the Pride fight their former benefactors. After the Pride's defeat, Karolina is sent to live with foster parents, but she organizes a secret reunion for the Runaways, after which they run away again, this time to the Pride's old lair beneath the La Brea Tar Pits. Karolina is portrayed as having a wide, free spirit, notably when she discovers she can fly. But she is also shown as being quite sensitive, often crying at her pain and misfortune, as well as the pain and misfortune of others.

As a fugitive

In the early issues of Runaways, volume 2, Karolina fights under the command of de facto leader Nico. Karolina expresses more comfort with being an extraterrestrial and makes strong hints at being a lesbian, especially as she stops to compliment Julie Power on her beauty during a battle with Excelsior over the custody of Victor Mancha and later even agrees to go on a date with her following a joint Avengers Academy/Runaways mission (and would eventually become romantically involved). Soon after Victor joins the team, Karolina "comes out" to Nico with an attempted kiss, which Nico rejects outright. Karolina's "outcast" insecurities resurface when her Skrull fiancée Xavin comes to Earth in search for her. Unbeknownst to her, Karolina's parents arranged Xavin's and Karolina's marriage as part of a peace-weaving effort between the Skrull and Majesdanian (her species) homeworlds. Karolina leaves with Xavin, much to Nico's distress.

While on her home planet Majesdane, Karolina learns to control the shift between her Majesdanian and humanoid forms and how to further control her solar powers. However, the wedding does not go as planned and the couple flees towards Earth as their homeworlds reignite the old war. They crash land near the Hostel and return in time to assist in the rescue of Molly Hayes. Karolina has a dream of her parents tearing her apart. Karolina remains with the team and Xavin becomes accepted as a member after Gertrude Yorkes' death, and they both join the Runaways in defeating the Gibborim for good. When the Runaways are accidentally displaced in 1907, Karolina meets Klara Prast, and convinces everyone to accept her on the team.

Deportation and other activities
In S.W.O.R.D. #2, Karolina is one of the aliens kidnapped by Henry Gyrich in his "aliens go home" policy. He uses pheromones to target Karolina's Majesdanian physiology and leads her away from the Runaways and kidnaps her without difficulty. She was eventually freed along with the other aliens. She assists in saving the Earth from a fleet of murder-happy aliens. Abigail Brand, now the sole head of S.W.O.R.D., returns all the aliens to Earth, reassuring them they will have their freedom and they are each owed one favor. In Avengers Arena, Karolina and Molly sought out Hank Pym for help when Nico and Chase go missing. Karolina dismissed Molly's concerns that somebody took their friends instead she believed they ran off to be together. Karolina later appears in the pages of Avengers Undercover where she and Molly visit Nico and Chase in the S.H.I.E.L.D. detention center after Hazmat allegedly killed Arcade. Karolina entered a relationship with Julie Power of Power Pack.

Reunion
After the Runaways disbanded for some time, Karolina has moved on to a happy new life in college and left behind her anxieties over her old life with the help of therapy; thus, declined the invitation to reunite even with the return of undead Gert. Karolina reasoned she had grown up and changed from their time as scared kids on the run. She also felt it didn't make sense for them to get back together because they were never a team, like the Avengers, or had a mission, other than staying alive and not becoming their parents. Nico agreed with Karolina's assessment, but it still left her riddled with guilt. Karolina dropped by Nico's apartment to reconsider the reunion when Nico attempted to kiss Karolina but is rejected due to having a girlfriend and dismissed it as Nico's habit of seeking comfort at times of stress. The Runaways banded together to rescue Gert and Molly from Molly's mad scientist grandmother's house. Karolina avoided hurting Molly's grandmother and her genetically engineered creations; however, once Nico was struck by a telepathic attack, Karolina blasted the house and put an end to it. Battered but finding solace together as a makeshift family, they all decided to go home.

At this point the Runaways resettled into their old hideout, the Hostel. Karolina is fitting in like she never left like her friendship with Nico hasn't missed a beat, but she struggles to give equal attention to her classes and girlfriend. When Julie's eagerly awaited visit is interrupted by Doctor Doom's attack on the hostel, Karolina and Julie don't see eye-to-eye on how Runaways improvise-styled battle plan and their functionality as a super-hero family team works. Julie expressed frustration of Karolina not opening up in their relationship, especially about her past that's now her present. To drown her sorrows in sugar over Karolina ignoring her once again, Julie unknowingly ate an enchanted cupcake that transformed her back to a thirteen year old forever. The Runaways eventually reverse the spell, but Julie still broke up with Karolina as she felt Karolina placed her membership in the Runaways on a higher priority. While Nico and Karolina bonded over lost loves, Karolina admitted she had been neglecting Julie which, perhaps, made their breakup inevitable. Following the break-up, Karolina invited Nico to attend her parents’ legitimate children's charity ball with her. While there, Nico confessed her feelings asking Karolina for a second chance. Karolina was surprised and scared. After some hesitation that left Karolina feeling rejected again, Nico finally seized her chance and the two kissed, beginning a relationship.

Characterization

Relationships 

Karolina gets along well with the other Runaways, and the only time she had ever got into an argument with them was after they questioned her about Xavin's gender. She has an older-sister type relationship with Molly, but a caring relationship with both Chase and Victor, whom she had both comforted after they lost loved ones.

Nico Minoru 
It was subtly hinted throughout the first volume of Runaways that Karolina had harbored a longtime crush on Nico. Much later, Karolina attempted to kiss Nico, but was rejected. Karolina then came out to Nico as a lesbian, admitting her feelings for Nico. After deciding to leave Earth to marry Xavin, Karolina left her medical alert bracelet with Nico as a token of remembrance. When Karolina later returned to Earth, she accidentally confessed to Xavin (who had taken on the form of Nico) that she was still in love with Nico. Despite this, Karolina remained staunch in her devotion to Xavin, and thus her feelings for and attraction to Nico occasionally put a strain on their friendship.

When the Runaways re-banded sometime later, Nico made possible romantic overtures towards Karolina, ultimately attempting to kiss her. However, Karolina rejected Nico out of faithfulness to Julie and dismissed it as Nico's habit of seeking comfort in times of stress. Following Julie and Karolina's break-up, Karolina invited Nico to attend her parents’ legitimate foundation's a charity ball with her. While there, Karolina's usual nervousness was replaced by newfound confidence because of Nico's support as she's felt Nico had “always seen the real” her. Nico confessed she was confused about herself for so long she couldn't see her clearly. Nico knows who and what she wants now and asks Karolina for a second chance. Karolina was surprised and scared, which exacerbated her old feelings of rejection when Nico pulled away. But Nico seized her chance and the two kissed, beginning a relationship.

Xavin 
Xavin came to Earth to marry Karolina, revealing that their parents had arranged a marriage between the two of them in order to keep Earth safe from Skrull attacks. Karolina initially rejected Xavin; Xavin attempted to persuade her, explaining that the marriage would be part of a peace treaty. Karolina still refused, stating that it would be a "lie" for her to marry a man. Xavin then revealed that Skrulls had the ability to shapeshift into different sexes, prompting Karolina to decide to accept the marriage proposal. However, they were later unable to get married when war broke out again between the Skrulls and Majesdanians. They escaped to Earth and re-joined the Runaways. Throughout their relationship, Karolina apparently fully accepted Xavin's continued changing between male and female appearances. However, she secretly expressed confusion and doubts over Xavin's true gender. However, during an argument, Xavin subconsciously reverted to female human form, which pleased Karolina. Their relationship ended when Xavin left Earth with a remaining group of Majesdanians, sacrificing themself for Karolina.

Julie Power 
Karolina flirted with and later began dating Julie Power, after a trip to Avengers Academy; this resulted in long-term relationship. Julie attempted to convince Karolina to move to New York so they could be together full-time after the past year apart, though Karolina was resistant to this. After visiting Karolina in Los Angeles, Julie broke up with her, believing that she and Karolina were too incompatible, and that Karolina's first priority would always be to the Runaways.

Conceptual changes 
In Brian K. Vaughan's original pitch for the series, Karolina Dean was originally called Leslie. This name would eventually be given to the character's mother. Her parents were originally real estate agents, rather than famous actors.
Karolina's Majesdanian form has been colored in two distinct styles.  Brian Reber, the first colorist of Runaways, colored Karolina with many different colors of the visible spectrum from panel to panel. Christina Strain, the second colorist for Runaways, colors Karolina in lighter tones, using primarily blue, yellow, and pink with a glitter-like effect.

Powers and abilities
Like all Majesdanians, Karolina's natural form is luminous, iridescent, and visually fluid, often depicted with waves of rainbow-like light floating off her body (Chase described her as "a burning painting") though body structure is essentially humanoid. Originally, Karolina required a custom made medic alert bracelet constructed of an unspecified alien metal to revert to humanoid form. However, after spending many months on Majesdane, Karolina learned to control the change and can make it at will. In her Majesdanian form, Karolina is able to manipulate solar energy absorbed by her body to generate large concussive blasts, fine laser-like beams and force fields capable of stopping cave-ins, gunfire and explosions. Like her parents, Karolina learned the ability to bind people, binding a New Pride in a colorful sphere. Karolina's Majesdanian form also grants her the ability to fly. During an encounter with the vampire Topher, it is revealed that Karolina's blood also harbors solar energy-based properties, because drinking her blood caused Topher to combust.

The drawback to Karolina's powers is that they have a finite charge. If she is in her Majesdanian form too long or exerts her powers too much, her glow will start to fade and revert her to human form until she uses the sun's rays to recharge. The only time she entirely lost her powers was when the Runaways battled the Gibborim to prevent Chase from sacrificing himself. Leslie Dean stated early in the series that Majesdanians' abilities do not affect one another.

Cultural impact and legacy

Critical reception 
Peyton Hinckle of ComicsVerse referred to Karolina Dean as a "fan favorite," writing, "Her popularity has grown even more, making her one of the most well-known lesbian characters in the comics industry. Readers and viewers alike adore Karolina Dean for her free-spiritedness and diverse background. But I think there’s more to Karolina’s character than just what’s on the surface. Yes, she’s a rare gem in a sea of heterosexual heroes, but she’s also one of the best role models Marvel has (which might not be saying much but you get the point). Like so many real-life queer teens, Karolina struggled to understand her true self: as a superpowered alien and as a lesbian. She also was able to overcome those struggles and find self-acceptance. As readers, viewers, and fans, we can take our own challenges and use Karolina’s model to become the people we want to be." Theo Kogod of CBR.com described Karolina as one of Marvel's "well-written and diverse heroes," asserting, "Admittedly, it took a while for the company to take a stand and show meaningful LGBTQ+representation. But over the years, more and more queer heroes have appeared at the forefront of major Marvel comics. Like with the Young Avengers, Runaways was a series designed to focus on a team of teenaged heroes that included LGBTQ+ characters front and center. The original Runaways series was written by Brian K. Vaughan and drawn by Adrian Alophona, and its first issue was released in 2003. Vaughan has made his commitment to diversity and allyship core to his writing, and so he included the character Karolina Dean as a lesbian. Sadly, representation was pretty limited in 2003 and this was initially only hinted at. However, Karolina would later enter into a same-sex relationship with her teammate Nico. While modern readers might not think much of this, it was a huge deal at the time." Joshua Yehl of IGN said, "Finding out you are an alien and running away from your super villain parents is hard enough, but teenager Karolina Dean also had to deal with her intimate feelings toward fellow teammate Nico. Throughout the first volume of Runaways, Kar was mainly trying to come to grips with how her being an alien made her the outsider of the team, but there were also subtle hints of her attraction to Nico. She even went so far as to act suicidal by offering up her life to a vampire. With time, she eventually overcame her insecurities and came out to Nico by trying to kiss her. Nico rejected Kar, which led to a relapse of insecurity, this time about her homosexuality. The girl can’t catch a break! Kar wouldn’t be the first gay person to develop feelings for a straight friend, and that’s what makes writer Brian K. Vaughan and artist Adrian Alphona’s depiction of her so authentic. The reader watches her struggle with her feelings, spiral downward into self-destruction, and rise back up by expressing herself only to hit a new low afterward. Coming out is not an easy one-time event, but a long, emotional process that doesn’t always turn out as planned. While Kar did not get the reaction she wanted from Nico, she made the same awkward coming out mistakes that countless others have, making this alien girl feel all the more human." Vanessa Friedman of Autostraddle called Karolina one of the "female heroines who have positively impacted our brains and our world," stating, "Karolina is a glowing, flying teenage daughter of alien supervillains who’s the emotional center of her team. Xavin is her shapeshifting Super-Skrull fiancée who’s one of the few transgender characters in all of comics. Together they form one of the best queer couples in recent comics, showing not only that you can have three-dimensional queer characters, but also that gender isn’t a simple, straightforward binary. These two are able to not only overcome their supervillian legacies, but also the racism and homophobia that they face for being an interracial lesbian couple."

Accolades 

 In 2013, Autostraddle included Karolina in their "20 Kickass Girls in Books, Comics, TeeVee, Movies, and Pop Culture In General" list.
 In 2014, BuzzFeed ranked Karolina 4th in their "12 Kick-Ass Gay Women In Comics And Graphic Novels" list.
 In 2014, Autostraddle ranked Karolina 10th in their "11 Female Superheroes I Wish Marvel Would Make Movies About" list.
 In 2015, WhatCulture ranked Karolina 1st in their "12 LGBTQ Comic Book Characters Ready For Live-Action Adaptation" list.
 In 2015, Bustle ranked Karolina 4th in their "14 Female Superheroes Who Deserve Stardom" list.
 In 2017, BuzzFeed ranked Karolina 23rd in their "27 Kick-Ass Female Superheroes You'll Love If Wonder Woman Is Your Favorite" list.
 In 2018, CBR.com ranked Karolina 4th in their "20 Daughters Of Supervillains Who Are Deadlier Than Their Parents" list.
 In 2019, CBR.com ranked Karolina 2nd in their "The 10 Most Powerful Members of The Runaways" list.
 In 2020, Scary Mommy included Karolina in their "Looking For A Role Model? These 195+ Marvel Female Characters Are Truly Heroic" list.
 In 2020, CBR.com ranked Karolina 4th in their "A-Force: 10 Heroines That Should Join The Marvel Team" list.
 In 2021, CBR.com ranked Karolina 2nd in their "10 LGBTQ+ Marvel Characters Who Deserve A Solo Series" list.

Other versions

House of M
Karolina Dean is mentioned as being a "go-to" girl for the Wolfpack.  However, this is a ploy to capture the Wolfpack. It is mentioned, however, that the Pride rule Southern California.

Marvel Zombies Halloween
A zombie Karolina Dean is attacking Kitty Pryde and her son Peter in Marvel Zombies Halloween. She is stopped by Mephisto.

In other media

Television
Karolina Dean appears in the Hulu television series, Runaways portrayed by Virginia Gardner. Karolina's power dampening bracelet is still intact, but her fear of removing it comes from her mother's religious-like background. She is mocked at school by her peers who view her as being brainwashed by her cult-like religion called the Church of Gibborim founded by her grandfather and a benefactor named Jonah. Throughout the course of the first season, she slowly learns more about her true form and her supernatural powers. She later kisses Nico, revealing her feelings, and the two then begin a relationship. In season two, she learns and embraces her dual identity of human and alien. Instead of being Majesdanian, she is half-human and half-Gibborim from a family of exiled Royal Magistrates.

Video games
 Karolina Dean appears as a playable character in Playdom's video game Marvel: Avengers Alliance.
 Karolina Dean is a collectible miniature playing piece in Heroclix, Wizkids game of Super Hero table top combat.
 Karolina Dean is a playable character in Lego Marvel Super Heroes 2 as part of a DLC Season Pass.
 Karolina Dean is a playable character in the freemium mobile game Marvel Avengers Academy until it shut down on February 4, 2019.
 Karolina Dean is a playable character in mobile game Marvel Puzzle Quest.

See also
LGBT themes in comics

References

Characters created by Brian K. Vaughan
Fictional lesbians
Fictional LGBT characters in television
Marvel Comics aliens
Fictional characters who can manipulate light
Comics characters introduced in 2003
Marvel Comics extraterrestrial superheroes
Marvel Comics female superheroes
Marvel Comics LGBT superheroes
Fictional vegan and vegetarian characters